A Better Tomorrow is a 1986 Hong Kong crime action film directed and co-written by John Woo, and starring Ti Lung, Leslie Cheung and Chow Yun-fat. The film had a profound influence on Hong Kong action cinema, and has been recognised as a landmark film credited with setting the template for the heroic bloodshed genre, with considerable influence on both the Hong Kong film industry and Hollywood.

Produced with a tight budget and released with virtually no advertising, A Better Tomorrow broke Hong Kong's box office record and went on to become a blockbuster in Asia. The film is highly regarded, ranking #2 in the Best 100 Chinese Motion Pictures. Its success led to a sequel, A Better Tomorrow II, also directed by Woo, and A Better Tomorrow 3: Love & Death in Saigon, a prequel directed by Tsui Hark. It has been remade several times.

The film was Chow Yun-fat's breakout role and launched him as one of the top superstars in the Hong Kong film industry. Chow's character "Mark Lee" has been imitated by many fans even decades after the film's release. Following this film, Chow went on to make several more notable films with Woo.

Plot
Sung Tse-Ho is a senior member of a powerful Hong Kong triad, managing a lucrative printing and distributing operation that produces counterfeit American bank notes. Ho is a respected member of the organization, entrusted with the most important transactions. Mark Lee is his best friend, bodyguard, and business partner. The prologue follows a day in the life of Ho and Mark as they watch a fresh batch of counterfeit notes being printed and meet with foreign clients to trade their product for counterfeit Hong Kong dollar notes.

Meanwhile, Ho's younger brother, Kit, has just graduated high school and is currently training to join the police. Ho hides his criminal life from his brother and encourages Kit's career choice, while their ailing father pleads for Ho to leave his life of crime. Ho agrees, deciding that he will retire from the triad after his next deal in Taiwan. Shing, a low-ranking triad member, joins Ho after he agrees to mentor him. However, they are ambushed by the Taiwanese triads, leading to a shootout in which Ho and Shing flee into a sewage tunnel entrance, pursued by local law enforcement. Ho tells Shing to run and surrenders to the police in order to buy time for him to escape, leading to a three-year prison sentence.

After learning of the deal, the triads attempt to kidnap Ho's father as leverage to ensure Ho's silence in prison; Ho's father is fatally stabbed before Kit and his girlfriend Jackie manage to subdue the attacker. With his dying breath, he pleads Kit to forgive his brother for his criminal actions, and an enraged Kit blames Ho for their father's death. Later, Mark travels to Taiwan to get answers from the Taiwanese triad. He visits a restaurant where the gangster who planned the ambush is dining and kills him following a shootout with his bodyguards. However, Mark's leg is injured in the process, leaving him crippled and requiring a leg brace.

After Ho is released from prison, he is approached by a corrupt policeman, who offers to take him back to triad headquarters so he can rejoin his old organization. Ho, determined to start a new life, declines the offer and instead begins working for a taxi company run by another ex-con named Ken. During one of his shifts, Ho encounters Mark, and he discovers that his old friend is now a bitter, broken shell of his former self after Shing stripped him of his position in the triad and cast him aside in his rise to power. When they reunite, Mark urges Ho to confront Shing, but Ho refuses. Ho then seeks out Kit, now a police officer, in hopes of reconciling. 

However, Ho is harshly rebuffed by Kit, who still blames Ho for their father's death and because his relation to Ho is preventing him from advancing his career. In an effort to prove himself and further distance himself from his brother, Kit becomes obsessed with bringing down Shing, despite Ho's warnings. Shing, hearing of Ho's return to Hong Kong, tries to persuade him to return and help expand their triad into drug trafficking, but Ho refuses. Shing then has his men attack the taxi company, severely beat Mark, and lure Kit into a trap that leaves him critically wounded. Though Ho is still hesitant to take action, Mark is eventually able to persuade Ho to retaliate.

Mark steals a computer tape containing printing plate data from the counterfeiting business and they then discover that it was Shing who set up the ambush three years prior. Meanwhile, Shing sets up triad leader Yie and shoots him dead; the witnesses are told to lie to the police that Ho was the killer. Ho and Mark then use the tape to blackmail Shing in exchange for money and an escape boat. Ho ensures that the tape is passed to Kit as proof of Shing's crimes. Using Shing as a hostage, Ho and Mark take the money to a pier, where Shing's men await. There, Ho implores Mark to escape by himself in the boat, and Mark hesitantly agrees.

After Mark's departure, Kit arrives on the scene intending to arrest Shing, but ends up being taken hostage. A deal is made to exchange Shing for Kit, but the negotiation spirals into first a standoff and eventually a shootout. Ho and Kit work together against Shing's men, and are overwhelmed. Mark, hearing the sounds of gunfire, quickly returns to the scene. Ho, Kit and Mark kill several of Shing's henchmen, but also suffer injuries in the process. During a lull in the gunfight, Ho attempts to make peace with Kit but is rebuffed again. Mark then reprimands Kit, telling him that Ho's present actions have atoned for the past. As the three are distracted however, Mark is fatally shot in the back by Shing.

As the police approach, Shing mocks Ho and Kit, proclaiming that once he enters police custody, his money and power will ensure his swift release. Kit then hands Ho his gun, allowing him to fatally shoot Shing. As Kit watches Shing's body fall to the ground, Ho suddenly handcuffs himself to Kit. The two brothers then begin walking together towards the gathered crowd of police.

Cast

Production 
The film is an uncredited remake of the 1967 Lung Kong film 英雄本色 (pinyin Yīngxióng běnsè) which has the same Chinese name but a different English name: Story of a Discharged Prisoner, which is No. 39 on the Hong Kong Film Awards list of the Top 100 Chinese Films. It was also partially inspired by The Brothers, a 1979 Hong Kong crime film, plot elements of which were reimagined for A Better Tomorrow. The Brothers had a similar plot about two brothers on opposing sides of the law, the elder brother a mobster and the younger brother a cop. In turn, The Brothers was a remake of Deewaar (1975), a hit Indian crime drama written by Salim–Javed.

The scene in which Mark Lee tells the story of being forced to drink urine is apparently based on a real incident involving Chow Yun-fat and director Ringo Lam. This scene was recreated in Woo's Bullet in the Head, which was originally scripted as a prequel to A Better Tomorrow, before being changed to a standalone film.

The English title is from the Lo Ta-yu song Tomorrow will be Better (明天会更好/明天會更好), which is traditionally sung during New Year's Eve, and is featured in the film.

Filming locations

Hong Kong 

 Jackson Road, Central
 Central Police Station, Central
 Kennedy Town, Central and Western
 Wan Chai, Wan Chai District
 Saint Paul Seminary, Causeway Bay
 Sunning Plaza, Causeway Bay
 Kowloon Peak
 To Kwa Wan, Kowloon City
 Stonecutters Island
 Tin Hau Temple Complex, Kowloon Peninsula
 Wo Hop Shek Public Cemetery

Taiwan 

 Ximending, Taipei
 Renai Road, Taipei
 Taichung Correctional Center, Taichung

Music 

 During the nightclub scene, the song being played in the background (幾許風雨, "How Much Wind and Rain") is the Cantonese version of a classic South Korean song called 'Hee Na Ree' (희나리) sung originally by Goo Chang-mo in 1985. The Cantonese version in the movie was sung by Roman Tam, considered the "godfather" of Cantopop.
 Also heard in the soundtrack is "Sparrowfall 1", a track from Brian Eno's 1978 album, Music for Films.
 The film also contains "Birdy's Theme" (from the film Birdy) by Peter Gabriel incorporated into the soundtrack.
 In the scene where Ho meets Jackie back stage of the music recital to tell her he is leaving, the children's choir is singing Tomorrow will be Better (明天会更好/明天會更好), written by Lo Ta-yu.  This is likely the origin of the film's English title.

Reception 
A Better Tomorrow grossed $34,651,324 HKD at the Hong Kong box office.

In 2009, Empire Magazine named it #20 in a poll of the 20 Greatest Gangster Movies You've Never Seen* (*Probably)

Awards and nominations

Sequels and remakes 
The success of A Better Tomorrow spawned two follow-ups. A direct sequel, A Better Tomorrow 2, was released the following year. John Woo returned to direct, as did most of the main cast, with Chow Yun-fat playing Mark's hitherto-unmentioned twin brother Ken. A prequel, A Better Tomorrow III: Love & Death in Saigon, was released in 1989, with Chow returning to play Mark. Woo was not involved in the prequel, due to a falling-out with Tsui Hark, so Hark directed the film himself. Woo's unproduced screenplay draft was later made as Bullet in the Head (1990).

The film has two official remakes. A Better Tomorrow (2010) was produced in South Korea, directed by Song Hae-sung, with John Woo serving as executive producer. A Better Tomorrow 2018 (2018) was produced in Mainland China, directed by Ding Sheng.

Cultural impact
 After the film, teenage boys in Hong Kong wore long dusters in emulation of Chow's character even though the climate was sub-tropical. In fact, in colloquial Cantonese, trench coats are called "Mark Gor Lau" (literally, Brother Mark's coat).
 The storyline (including dialogs and costumes) was made into a Thai film Diamond Kingdom (Phet Payak Kharat) in 1988 with many Thai performers involved. Sombat Metanee as Tanong (Sung Tse Ho in original version), Sorapong Chatree as Chat (Mark Lee in original version), Chairat Chittham as Ruj (Sung Tse Kit in original version), with Pumpuang Duangjan as Pen (Tanong's lover not in original version). It was created without copyright.
 The Wu-Tang Clan has a song named after the film on their 1997 album Wu-Tang Forever.
 The Wu-Tang Clan 20th anniversary album also shares the name A Better Tomorrow.
The anime series Cowboy Bebop has many references to the film series, including the last fight between Spike and Vicious in the episode "The Real Folk Blues (Part 2)" which parallels the final shoot out in "A Better Tomorrow 2".
The character Mr. Chang from the Black Lagoon is closely patterned after Chow's character Mark in both visual design and characterisation. 
Chow wore Alain Delon sunglasses in the movie. After the movie, Hong Kong was sold out of Alain Delon's sunglasses. Delon sent Chow a personal thank you note.
 The 1994 Bollywood film Aatish: Feel the Fire (1994), directed by Sanjay Gupta, was an unofficial remake combining elements of both the Bollywood classic Deewaar (1975) and John Woo's A Better Tomorrow. The film starred Sanjay Dutt, Atul Agnihotri, Aditya Pancholi and Shakti Kapoor.
The theme song was covered in 2016 by Louis Koo and Leo Ku in memoriam of Leslie Cheung.

References

External links

 
 
 

1986 films
1980s crime action films
1980s crime drama films
1980s buddy films
Hong Kong buddy films
Hong Kong crime action films
Hong Kong gangster films
Triad films
Gun fu films
Films about families
Films about brothers
Films about criminals
Films about friendship
Films set in Hong Kong
Films set in Taipei
Films directed by John Woo
A Better Tomorrow films
1980s Cantonese-language films
Best Film HKFA
Hong Kong neo-noir films
1986 drama films
Hong Kong New Wave films
Hong Kong action drama films